Mandeville's paradox is named after Bernard Mandeville (1670–1733), who posits that actions which may be qualified as vicious with regard to individuals have benefits for society as a whole. This is alluded to in the subtitle of his most famous work, The Fable of The Bees: or, Private Vices, Public Benefits. He states that "Fraud, Luxury, and Pride must live; Whilst we the Benefits receive."

The philosopher and economist Adam Smith opposes this (although he defends a moderated version of this line of thought in his theory of the invisible hand), since Mandeville fails, in his opinion, to distinguish between vice and virtue.

References 

Paradoxes
Social philosophy
Paradoxes in economics